Sophie Georges (born 8 February 1977) is a former professional tennis player from France.

Biography
Georges was born in Saint-Dizier and started playing tennis at the age of six.

A right-handed player, Georges won her only ITF singles title at Calvi in 1997. At the 1999 French Open she featured in the main draw after being granted a wildcard and was beaten in the first round by Cristina Torrens Valero. She also appeared in the main draw of the 2001 Internationaux de Strasbourg, as a qualifier. Her career best singles ranking was 182 in the world, which she reached in June, 2001.

ITF finals

Singles: 4 (1-3)

Doubles: 9 (4-5)

References

External links
 
 

1977 births
Living people
French female tennis players
People from Saint-Dizier
Sportspeople from Haute-Marne